An editorial, or leading article (UK) or leader (UK) is an article written by the senior editorial people or publisher of a newspaper, magazine, or any other written document, often unsigned. Australian and major United States newspapers, such as The New York Times and The Boston Globe, often classify editorials under the heading "opinion".

Illustrated editorials may appear in the form of editorial cartoons.

Typically, a newspaper's editorial board evaluates which issues are important for their readership to know the newspaper's opinion on.

Editorials are typically published on a dedicated page, called the editorial page, which often features letters to the editor from members of the public; the page opposite this page is called the op-ed page and frequently contains opinion pieces (hence the name think pieces) by writers not directly affiliated with the publication.  However, a newspaper may choose to publish an editorial on the front page. In the English-language press, this occurs rarely and only on topics considered especially important; it is more common, however, in some European countries such as Denmark, Spain, Italy, and France.

Many newspapers publish their editorials without the name of the leader writer. Tom Clark, leader-writer for The Guardian, says that it ensures readers discuss the issue at hand rather than the author. On the other hand, an editorial does reflect the position of a newspaper and the head of the newspaper, the editor, is known by name. Whilst the editor will often not write the editorial themselves, they maintain oversight and retain responsibility.

In the field of fashion publishing, the term is often used to refer to photo-editorials – features with often full-page photographs on a particular theme, designer, model or other single topic, with or (as in a photo-essay) without accompanying text.

See also

References

External links

Newspaper content
Opinion journalism
Periodical articles